Costel Lazăr (born 19 June 1962) is a Romanian former footballer who played as a midfielder. After ending his playing career, he worked as a sports director at Astra Giurgiu and Petrolul Ploiești, also coaching the latter for a few Divizia A rounds in 2001.

International career
Costel Lazăr played two friendly games at international level for Romania against Egypt.

Honours
Petrolul Ploiești
Divizia B: 1988–89
Midia Năvodari
Divizia C: 1996–97

Notes

References

1962 births
Living people
Romanian footballers
Romania international footballers
Association football midfielders
Liga I players
Liga II players
Israeli Premier League players
Liga Leumit players
FC Petrolul Ploiești players
Hapoel Tel Aviv F.C. players
Shimshon Tel Aviv F.C. players
FCM Câmpina players
FC Astra Giurgiu players
Romanian expatriate footballers
Expatriate footballers in Israel
Expatriate sportspeople in Israel
Romanian expatriates in Israel
Romanian expatriate sportspeople in Israel
Romanian sports executives and administrators
Romanian football managers
FC Petrolul Ploiești managers
Sportspeople from Ploiești